The One and Only is a 2002 British romantic comedy film directed by Simon Cellan Jones, and starring Richard Roxburgh, Justine Waddell and Sharon Scurfield. The film is a remake of Susanne Bier's 1999 Danish box-office hit Den Eneste Ene. Supported by the Newcastle City Council to promote a positive image of the city, the story was reset in Newcastle and Gateshead.

Plot

Two couples childless visit their doctor to discuss the matter. Stevie is married to Sonny, an Italian footballer who plays for Newcastle United, but who has succumbed to frequent injury. He is desperate for a child, and it soon emerges that Stevie has not really been trying. She is reluctant to become pregnant as she does not want to get fat. Jenny and Neil are trying to adopt, as Neil is infertile. Being childless has turned Jenny into something of a monster, and Neil now views her with dislike. He wants to break with her but is too kind-hearted. He goes ahead with the plan to adopt to keep her happy. When Stevie meets Neil on the day he comes to deliver her brand new kitchen, it is already too late for love at first sight. Too late for both of them. Stevie is already five minutes pregnant by her Italian footballer husband. And too late for Neil, too - his wife Jenny has already applied to adopt an African girl. But too late or otherwise, love at first sight is exactly what happens. How can Neil and Stevie get out of their mistaken marriages and into each other's arms?

Cast

Reception
Neil Smith of the BBC gave it 1 out of 5 and wrote: "A love letter to Newcastle that, if nothing else, will be remembered for some of the worst accents ever heard in a British picture." Empire gave it 2 out of 5.

References

External links
 
 
 BBC News review

2002 films
2002 romantic comedy films
Films set in Newcastle upon Tyne
Remakes of Danish films
British romantic comedy films
Films directed by Simon Cellan Jones
2000s English-language films
2000s British films